The following lists events that happened during 1832 in Australia.

Events
7 February - The West Australian Legislative Council and Executive Council meet for the first time
13 February - The King's School opens in Parramatta
18 August - The Savings Bank of New South Wales is established

Births

 5 January – Edward William Cole, bookseller (born in the United Kingdom) (d. 1918)
 7 January – James Munro, 15th Premier of Victoria (born in the United Kingdom) (d. 1908)
 7 February – Samuel Wilson, Victorian politician and pastoralist (born in Ireland) (d. 1895)
 14 March – Sir James Fergusson, 8th Governor of South Australia (born in the United Kingdom) (d. 1907)
 21 August – Sir Simon Fraser, Victorian politician, pastoralist and businessman (born in Canada) (d. 1919)
 9 November – Lorimer Fison, anthropologist, minister and journalist (born in the United Kingdom) (d. 1907)
 14 November – Henry Strangways, 12th Premier of South Australia (born in the United Kingdom) (d. 1920)
 15 November – Julian Tenison Woods, priest and geologist (born in the United Kingdom) (d. 1889)
 30 November – Sir James Dickson, 13th Premier of Queensland (born in the United Kingdom) (d. 1901)
 13 December – Richard Daintree, geologist and photographer (born in the United Kingdom) (d. 1878)
 Unknown – John Macrossan, Queensland politician (born in Ireland) (d. 1891)

Deaths

 1 September – Henry Hellyer, explorer (born in the United Kingdom) (b. 1790)
 7 December – Edward Wollstonecraft, businessman (born in the United Kingdom) (b. 1783)
 Unknown – Sir Henry Browne Hayes, convict (born and died in Ireland) (b. 1762)

References

 
Australia
Years of the 19th century in Australia